Melittia aureosquamata is a moth of the family Sesiidae. It is known from Malawi, South Africa and Zambia.

References

Sesiidae
Lepidoptera of Uganda
Moths of Sub-Saharan Africa
Lepidoptera of Malawi
Lepidoptera of Zambia
Moths described in 1863